Aurélie Froment (born 7 August 1987) is a French boxer and kickboxer. She is the current ISKA world super-featherweight freestyle and world lightweight K-1 champion.

She is the former ISKA European super-featherweight freestyle champion, and four time FFKMDA kickboxing champion.

Martial arts career

Kickboxing career
At La Nuit des Défis III fought Laëtitia Madjene. Froment ended up losing a unanimous decision.

During the Kick's Night 2018 event, Froment fought Irene Martins for the ISKA freestyle super-featherweight title. She won the fight and title by a fifth-round knockout.

Fighting during Kunlun Fight 74, she faced the Kunlun tournament winner Wang Kehan. She would lose the fight after three rounds, through a unanimous decision.

Boxing career
Aurélie Froment made her boxing debut on 16 March 2019. In her first professional boxing bout Froment faced the Serbian journeyman Ksenija Medic. After four rounds Froment emerged the clear winner with all scorecards reading 40–36.

Her next fight came a month later, when she fought Helena Claveau. Froment failed to win the fight, with the judges scoring the fight a draw (38–38, 38–38, 38–38).

Following this draw, Froment was scheduled to fight another journeyman, the Bosnian native Anja Jankovic. She scored the first KO win of her career, stopping Jankovic by TKO in the third round.

Four months after their first fight, Froment and Ksenija Medic fought a rematch. Medic once again lost a unanimous decision, although she managed to win a round this time (39–37).

Championships and accomplishments
International Sport Karate Association
ISKA World Super Featherweight Freestyle Kickboxing Championship
ISKA World Lightweight K-1 Championship
ISKA European Super Featherweight Freestyle Kickboxing Championship
Fédération Française de Kick Boxing, Muaythaï et Disciplines Associées
FFKMDA Kickboxing Championship (Four times)

Boxing record

Kickboxing record

|-  style="background:#cfc;"
| 2018-12-8|| Win ||align=left| Irene Martins || Kick's Night 2018 || Hérault, France || KO || 5 || 3:00 
|-
! style=background:white colspan=9 |
|-  style="background:#fbb;"
| 2018-05-13|| Loss ||align=left| Wang Kehan || Kunlun Fight 74 || Jinan, China || Decision (Unanimous) || 3 || 3:00
|-  style="background:#cfc;"
| 2017-6-3|| Win ||align=left| Nawel Karouach || Cavalaire Kickboxing Show 2 || Cavalaire-sur-Mer, France || Decision (Unanimous) || 5 || 3:00 
|-
! style=background:white colspan=9 |
|-  style="background:#fbb;"
| 2015-4-3|| Loss ||align=left| Laëtitia Madjene || La Nuit des Défis III || Béziers, France || Decision (Unanimous) || 3 || 3:00
|-
| colspan=9 | Legend:

See also
 List of female kickboxers
 List of female boxers

References 

French kickboxers

1987 births
Living people